Annandale-Little Pond-Howe Bay is a rural municipality located in Kings County, Prince Edward Island. It was incorporated in 1975.

Demographics 

See also 
List of municipalities in Prince Edward Island

References 

Communities in Kings County, Prince Edward Island
Rural municipalities in Prince Edward Island